This is a list of notable corporations headquartered, current and historically, in New York City, New York.  The table is arranged alphabetically by company, but can also be sorted by industry.

See also

 List of New York companies
 Tech companies in New York City

References

New York City
Companies